AlRawabi School for Girls is a Jordanian drama streaming television series about the impact of bullying on young women, directed by Tima Shomali and produced by Filmizion Productions (on behalf of Netflix). The six-part miniseries premiered in 32 languages and 190 countries on Netflix on August 12, 2021. It is dubbed in more than 9 languages, including English, Spanish, Italian, French, German, and Turkish. It is the second Jordanian Netflix original series after Jinn.

In May 2022, the series was renewed for a second season after originally being announced as a miniseries.

Plot
After Mariam is bullied in her elite Jordanian private school, she plans revenge with her friends. However, it has un-expected consequences. The show also portrays different aspects of school that aren't talked about. The show reflects and represents the patriarchy, corrupt systems/industries, bullying, sexual assault, reputation and the tradition of honour killings.

Cast

Main
 Andria Tayeh as Mariam
 Rakeen Sa'ad as Noaf
 Noor Taher as Layan Murad Fathi
 Yara Mustafa as Dina
 Joanna Arida as Rania
 Salsabiela A. as Ruqayya

Recurring
 Nadera Emran as Principal Faten Qadi 
 Reem Saadeh as Miss Abeer
 Jana Zeineddi as Laila
 Ahmad Hamdan as Laith Radwan
 Sari Silawi as Hazem

Episodes

Season 1 (2021)

Season 2 (2023)

Production

Development
When Tima Shomali developed the idea for AlRawabi School for Girls, she was not specifically thinking about a release on Netflix. According to an interview Shomali gave for Amman TV (and summarized by Al Bawaba) however, "the global streaming platform loved the show and translated it to several languages." Shomali also indicated in the same interview that her goal was to create a dialogue about the concept of bullying, as when she was growing up, the term "was not used, and we did not know what bullying meant, but we lived through it and did not know about it." Shomali also commented on her intent to introduce women's voices the "one thing I always found lacking in most shows that talk about women is the female perception on their issues. So I gathered around a brilliant team of women to work on developing and executing the show's creative vision. Together, we envisioned and built the elements of the Al Rawabi world, starting from the characters, set design, colors, lighting and even the music." Later, on April 13, 2019, Shomali announced to her followers on Facebook that she was working on creating an original Arabic Netflix series, in collaboration with her Jordanian production company Filmizion Productions, titled AlRawabi School for Girls. On May 18, 2022, Tima Shomali, Netflix MENA and the cast announced a season two to AlRawabi, despite the fact it was supposed to be a mini/limited series. She shared 3 photos via Instagram.

Casting
Working alongside the writer Shirin Kamal, Tima Shomali created a full female cast drama series, that takes place in an all girls school and explores the ideas of revenge and bullying. They cast "new faces", and allowed the actors to choose the characters that they wanted to portray.

Release

Response
According to Jordanian psychologist Samira H., AlRawabi School for Girls "depicts the significant impact of bullying on the mental health of young girls." She also states that she hopes "stories like the one portrayed in the series encourages parents and schools to be more sympathetic with those who are bullied so that they don’t feel so alone." AlRawabi also created controversy, as many thought it was an inaccurate representation of Jordan, their culture, lifestyle and society, along with Arabs as a whole. People have also criticized AlRawabi for some of the topics mentioned in the show. However, many loved this show. On social media, many praised the show for openly portraying topics which don't often get talked about. Many have also praised the show for portraying young/teenaged Arab girls.

See also
Jinn
Mean Girls
A Silent Voice
Boys Over Flowers
Cobra Kai
Elite
Heathers
Odd Girl Out

Further reading
'School is My Nightmare': AlRawabi School for Girls is Netflix's Latest Must-Watch Arabic Original, Egyptian Streets, August 15, 2021.
Everything to know about Netflix's new Arabic series, Emirates Woman, August 16, 2021.
Al-Rawabi School for Girls: Hilarious Behind the Scenes Moments... Watch, Al Bawaba, August 19, 2021.
I've just stalked the entire cast of AlRawabi School for Girls on social media - can we be best friends?, Cosmopolitan Middle East, August 29, 2021.
AlRawabi School for Girls: The Pink Madness of Netflix's Jordanian Hit, Cairo Scene, September 11, 2021.

References

External links
 
 
 

Arabic-language Netflix original programming
Jordanian television series
2021 Jordanian television series debuts
2020s teen drama television series
2020s school television series
Television series about bullying